Bodia is a village located in Jhajjar district, Haryana, India. It is also called Boria. Olympic wrestler Ravinder Khatri hails from this village.

References

Villages in Jhajjar district